Mont-Blanc, is a municipality in the Laurentides region of Quebec, Canada, part of the Les Laurentides Regional County Municipality.

The municipality was formerly known as Saint-Faustin–Lac-Carré. The application to change the name to the Municipality of Mont-Blanc was approved by the Government of Quebec on January 14, 2022 and officially modified on January 29, 2022.

History 
In 1996, the municipality of Saint-Faustin–Lac-Carré was formed when the municipalities of Lac-Carré and Saint-Faustin merged. Its inhabitants were called Faustilacois and Faustilacoises.

Demographics

Education

Sainte Agathe Academy (of the Sir Wilfrid Laurier School Board) in Sainte-Agathe-des-Monts serves English-speaking students in this community for both elementary and secondary levels.

See also
 Lac Sauvage

References

Incorporated places in Laurentides
Municipalities in Quebec